Bittacus chlorostigma is a species of hangingfly in the family Bittacidae. It is found in North America.

References

Bittacus
Articles created by Qbugbot
Insects described in 1881
Insects of North America